Epictia tenella, also known as the Guyana blind snake, is a species of blind snake found on Trinidad in the Caribbean, and in South America, where it ranges from Guyana south to Brazil and northwestern Peru.

It can reach a length of 170 mm (6-11/16 in) snout-to-vent.  It has a medium brown dorsal surface, with a paler ventral surface and a yellow tail.  Its head is dark except for a white to yellow spot covering the upper half of its rostral scale.

It is mesophilic.  It burrows in damp soil and rotting vegetation, and possibly in ant and termite colonies.  It feeds on ants, termites, millipedes, and eggs.

References

External links
Leptotyphlops tennela at the Encyclopedia of Life
Leptotyphlops tennela at the Reptile Database
 iNaturalist page

Epictia
Snakes of the Caribbean
Snakes of South America
Reptiles of Brazil
Reptiles of Colombia
Reptiles of Guyana
Reptiles of Peru
Reptiles of Trinidad and Tobago
Reptiles of Venezuela
Fauna of the Amazon
Reptiles described in 1939